Nominative determinism is the hypothesis that people tend to gravitate towards areas of work that fit their names. The term was first used in the magazine New Scientist in 1994, after the magazine's humorous "Feedback" column noted several studies carried out by researchers with remarkably fitting surnames. These included a book on polar explorations by Daniel Snowman and an article on urology by researchers named Splatt and Weedon. These and other examples led to light-hearted speculation that some sort of psychological effect was at work. Since the term appeared, nominative determinism has been an irregularly recurring topic in New Scientist, as readers continue to submit examples. Nominative determinism differs from the related concept aptronym, and its synonyms 'aptonym', 'namephreak', and 'Perfect Fit Last Name' (captured by the Latin phrase  'the name is a sign'), in that it focuses on causality. 'Aptronym' merely means the name is fitting, without saying anything about why it has come to fit.

The idea that people are drawn to professions that fit their name was suggested by psychologist Carl Jung, citing as an example Sigmund Freud who studied pleasure and whose surname means 'joy'. A few recent empirical studies have indicated that certain professions are disproportionately represented by people with appropriate surnames (and sometimes given names), though the methods of these studies have been challenged. One explanation for nominative determinism is implicit egotism, which states that humans have an unconscious preference for things they associate with themselves.

Background
In history, before people could gravitate towards areas of work that matched their names, many people were given names that matched their area of work. The way people are named has changed over time. In pre-urban times people were only known by a single name – for example, the Anglo-Saxon name Beornheard. Single names were chosen for their meaning or given as nicknames. In England it was only after the Norman conquest that surnames were added, although there were a few earlier bynames that were not hereditary,  such as Edmund Ironside. Surnames were created to fit the person, mostly from patronyms (e.g., John son of William becomes John Williamson), occupational descriptions (e.g., John Carpenter), character or traits (e.g., John Long), or location (e.g., John from Acton became John Acton). Names were not initially hereditary; only by the mid-14th century did they gradually become so. Surnames relating to trades or craft were the first to become hereditary, as the craft often persisted within the family for generations. The appropriateness of occupational names has decreased over time, because tradesmen did not always follow their fathers: an early example from the 14th century is "Roger Carpenter the pepperer".

Another aspect of naming was the importance attached to the wider meaning contained in a name. In 17th-century England it was believed that choosing a name for a child should be done carefully. Children should live according to the message contained in, or the meaning of their names. In 1652 William Jenkyn, an English clergyman, argued that first names should be "as a thread tyed about the finger to make us mindful of the errand we came into the world to do for our Master". In 1623, at a time when Puritan names such as Faith, Fortitude and Grace were appearing for the first time, English historian William Camden wrote that names should be chosen with "good and gracious significations", as they might inspire the bearer to good actions. With the rise of the British Empire the English naming system and English surnames spread across large portions of the globe.

By the beginning of the 20th century, Smith and Taylor were two of the three most frequently occurring English surnames; both were occupational, though few smiths and tailors remained. When a correspondence between a name and an occupation did occur, it became worthy of note. In an 1888 issue of the Kentish Note Book magazine a list appeared with "several carriers by the name of Carter; a hosier named Hosegood; an auctioneer named Sales; and a draper named Cuff".  Since then, a variety of terms for the concept of a close relationship between name and occupation have emerged. The term aptronym is thought to have been coined in the early 20th century by the American newspaper columnist Franklin P. Adams. Linguist Frank Nuessel coined "aptonym", without an 'r', in 1992. Other synonyms include 'euonym', 'Perfect Fit Last Name' (PFLN), and 'namephreak'. In literary science a name that particularly suits a character is called a 'charactonym'. Notable authors who frequently used charactonyms as a stylistic technique include Charles Dickens (e.g., Mr. Gradgrind, the tyrannical schoolmaster) and William Shakespeare (e.g., the lost baby Perdita in The Winter's Tale). Sometimes this is played for laughs, as with the character Major Major Major Major in Joseph Heller's Catch-22, who was named Major Major Major by his father as a joke and then was later in life promoted to major by "an IBM machine with a sense of humor almost as keen as his father's." Unlike nominative determinism, the concept of aptronym and its synonyms do not say anything about causality, such as why the name has come to fit.

Because of the potentially humorous nature of aptronyms, a number of newspapers have collected them. San Francisco Chronicle columnist Herb Caen reported irregularly on reader-submitted gems, including substitute teacher Mr. Fillin, piano teacher Patience Scales, and the Vatican's spokesman on the evils of rock 'n roll, Cardinal Rapsong. Similarly, the journalist Bob Levey on occasion listed examples sent in by readers of his column in the American newspaper The Washington Post: a food industry consultant named Faith Popcorn, a lieutenant called Sergeant, and a tax accountant called Shelby Goldgrab. A Dutch newspaper Het Parool had an irregularly featured column called "Nomen est omen" with Dutch examples. Individual name collectors have also published books of aptronyms. Onomastic scholar R. M. Rennick called for more verification of aptronyms appearing in newspaper columns and books. Lists of aptronyms in science, medicine, and law are more reliable as they tend to be drawn from easily verifiable sources.

Definition
Nominative determinism, literally "name-driven outcome", is the hypothesis that people tend to gravitate towards areas of work which reflect their names. The name fits because people, possibly subconsciously, made themselves fit. Nominative determinism differs from the concept of aptronyms in that it focuses on causality.

The term has its origin in the "Feedback" column of the magazine New Scientist in 1994. A series of events raised the suspicion of its editor, John Hoyland, who wrote in the 5 November issue:

Feedback editors John Hoyland and Mike Holderness subsequently adopted the term 'nominative determinism' as suggested by reader C. R. Cavonius. The term first appeared in the 17 December issue. Even though the magazine tried to ban the topic numerous times over the decades since, readers kept sending in curious examples. These included the U.S. Navy spokesman put up to answer journalists' questions about the Guantanamo Bay detention camp, one Lieutenant Mike Kafka; authors of the book The Imperial Animal Lionel Tiger and Robin Fox; and the UK Association of Chief Police Officers' spokesman on knife crime, Alfred Hitchcock.

As used in New Scientist the term nominative determinism only applies to work. In contributions to other newspapers New Scientist writers have stuck to this definition, with the exception of editor Roger Highfield in a column in the Evening Standard, in which he included "key attributes of life".

Prior to 1994 other terms for the suspected psychological effect were used sporadically. 'Onomastic determinism' was used as early as 1970 by Roberta Frank. Outside of science, 'cognomen syndrome' was used by playwright Tom Stoppard in his 1972 play Jumpers. In Ancient Rome the predictive power of a person's name was captured by the Latin proverb , meaning 'the name is a sign'. This saying is still in use today in English and other languages such as French, German, Italian, Dutch, and Slovenian.

New Scientist coined the term 'nominative contradeterminism' for people who move away from their name, creating a contradiction between name and occupation. Examples include Andrew Waterhouse, a professor of wine, would-be doctor Thomas Edward Kill, who subsequently changed his name to Jirgensohn, and the Archbishop of Manila, Cardinal Sin. The synonym 'inaptronym' is also sometimes used.

Research

Theoretical framework
The first scientists to discuss the concept that names had a determining effect were early 20th-century German psychologists. Wilhelm Stekel spoke of the "obligation of the name" in the context of compulsive behaviour and choice of occupation; Karl Abraham wrote that the determining power of names might be partially caused by inheriting a trait from an ancestor who was given a fitting name. He made the further inference that families with fitting names might then try to live up to their names in some way. In 1952 Carl Jung referred to Stekel's work in his theory of synchronicity (events without causal relationship that yet seem to be meaningfully related):

Jung listed striking instances among psychologists—including himself: "Herr Freud (Joy) champions the pleasure principle, Herr Adler (Eagle) the will to power, Herr Jung (Young) the idea of rebirth ..."

In 1975 psychologist Lawrence Casler called for empirical research into the relative frequencies of career-appropriate names to establish if there is an effect at work or whether we are being "seduced by Lady Luck". He proposed three possible explanations for nominative determinism: one's self-image and self-expectation being internally influenced by one's name; the name acting as a social stimulus, creating expectations in others that are then communicated to the individual; and genetics – attributes suited to a particular career being passed down the generations alongside the appropriate occupational surname.

In 2002 the researchers Pelham, Mirenberg, and Jones explored Casler's first explanation, arguing that people have a basic desire to feel good about themselves and behave according to that desire. These automatic positive associations would influence feelings about almost anything associated with the self. Given the mere ownership effect, which states that people like things more if they own them, the researchers theorised that people would develop an affection for objects and concepts that are associated with the self, such as their name. They called this unconscious power implicit egotism. Uri Simonsohn suggested that implicit egotism only applies to cases where people are nearly indifferent between options, and therefore it would not apply to major decisions such as career choices. Low-stakes decisions such as choosing a charity would show an effect. Raymond Smeets theorised that if implicit egotism stems from a positive evaluation of the self, then people with low self-esteem would not gravitate towards choices associated with the self, but possibly away from them. A lab experiment confirmed this.

Empirical evidence

Those with fitting names give differing accounts of the effect of their name on their career choices. Igor Judge, former Lord Chief Justice of England and Wales, said he has no recollection of anyone commenting on his destined profession when he was a child, adding "I'm absolutely convinced in my case it is entirely coincidental and I can't think of any evidence in my life that suggests otherwise." James Counsell on the other hand, having chosen a career in law just like his father, his sibling, and two distant relatives, reported having been spurred on to join the bar from an early age and he cannot remember ever wanting to do anything else. Sue Yoo, an American lawyer, said that when she was younger people urged her to become a lawyer because of her name, which she thinks may have helped her decision.  Weather reporter Storm Field was not sure about the influence of his name; his father, Dr. Frank Field, also a weather reporter, was his driving force. Psychology professor Lewis Lipsitt, a lifelong collector of aptronyms, was lecturing about nominative determinism in class when a student pointed out that Lipsitt himself was subject to the effect since he studied babies' sucking behaviour. Lipsitt said "That had never occurred to me." Church of England vicar Reverend Michael Vickers, who denied being a Vickers had anything to do with him becoming a vicar, suggesting instead that in some cases "perhaps people are actually escaping from their name, rather than moving towards their job".

While reports by owners of fitting names are of interest, some scientists, including Michalos and Smeets, have questioned their value in deciding whether nominative determinism is a real effect. Instead, they argue that the claim that a name affects life decisions is an extraordinary one that requires extraordinary evidence. To select only those cases that seem to give evidence for nominative determinism is to ignore those that do not. Analysis of large numbers of names is therefore needed. In 2002 Pelham, Mirenberg, and Jones analysed various databases containing first names, surnames, occupations, cities and states. In one study they concluded that people named Dennis gravitate towards dentistry. They did this by retrieving the number of dentists called Dennis (482) from a database of US dentists. They then used the 1990 Census to find out which male first name was the next most popular after Dennis: Walter. The likelihood of a US male being called Dennis was 0.415% and the likelihood of a US male being called Walter was 0.416%. The researchers then retrieved the number of dentists called Walter (257). Comparing the relative frequencies of Dennis and Walter led them to their conclusion that the name Dennis is over-represented in dentistry. However, in 2011, Uri Simonsohn published a paper in which he criticized Pelham et al. for not considering confounding factors and reported on how the popularity of Dennis and Walter as baby names has varied over the decades. Given Walter was a relatively old-fashioned name it was far more likely for Pelham et al. to find people named Dennis to have any job, not just that of dentist, and people named Walter to be retired. Simonsohn did indeed find a disproportionally high number of Dennis lawyers compared to Walter lawyers.

Aware of Simonsohn's critical analyses of their earlier methods, Pelham and Mauricio published a new study in 2015, describing how they now controlled for gender, ethnicity, and education confounds. In one study they looked at census data and concluded that men disproportionately worked in eleven occupations whose titles matched their surnames, for example, baker, carpenter, and farmer.

In 2009 Michalos reported the results of an analysis of the occurrences of people with the surname Counsell registered as independent barristers in England and Wales versus those with the name in England and Wales as whole. Given the low frequency of the name in England and Wales as a whole he expected to find no one registered, but three barristers named Counsell were found.

In 2015 researchers Limb, Limb, Limb and Limb published a paper on their study into the effect of surnames on medical specialisation. They looked at 313,445 entries in the medical register from the General Medical Council, and identified surnames that were apt for the speciality, for example, Limb for an orthopaedic surgeon, and Doctor for medicine in general. They found that the frequency of names relevant to medicine and to subspecialties was much greater than expected by chance. Specialties that had the largest proportion of names specifically relevant to that specialty were those for which the English language has provided a wide range of alternative terms for the same anatomical parts (or functions thereof). Specifically, these were genitourinary medicine (e.g., Hardwick and Woodcock) and urology (e.g., Burns, Cox, Ball). Neurologists had names relevant to medicine in general, but far fewer had names directly relevant to their specialty (1 in every 302). Limb, Limb, Limb and Limb did not report on looking for any confounding variables. In 2010 Abel came to a similar conclusion. In one study he compared doctors and lawyers whose first or last names began with three-letter combinations representative of their professions, for example, "doc", "law", and likewise found a significant relationship between name and profession. Abel also found that the initial letters of physicians' last names were significantly related to their subspecialty. For example, Raymonds were more likely to be radiologists than dermatologists.

As for Casler's third possible explanation for nominative determinism, genetics, researchers Voracek, Rieder, Stieger, and Swami found some evidence for it in 2015. They reported that today's Smiths still tend to have the physical capabilities of their ancestors who were smiths. People called Smith reported above-average aptitude for strength-related activities. A similar aptitude for dexterity-related activities among people with the surname Tailor, or equivalent spellings thereof, was found, but it was not statistically significant. In the researchers' view a genetic-social hypothesis appears more viable than the hypothesis of implicit egotism effects.

Notes

References

Bibliography

External links 

 
 
 
 
 
 
 
 
 

Names
Semantics
Cognitive biases
Employment